The R170 road is a regional road in Ireland linking Ardee and Murray's Cross in County Louth. The road passes through the town of Dunleer and the village of Grangebellew.

See also 

 Roads in Ireland
 National primary road
 National secondary road

References 

 Roads Act 1993 (Classification of Regional Roads) Order 2006 – Department of Transport

Regional roads in the Republic of Ireland
Roads in County Louth